Allotalanta spilothyris is a moth in the family Cosmopterigidae. It was described by Edward Meyrick in 1922. It is found in India (Assam).

References

Natural History Museum Lepidoptera generic names catalog

Moths described in 1922
Cosmopteriginae
Moths of Asia